The following is the qualification system for the 2023 Central American and Caribbean Games competition.

Qualification system 
A total of 250 (125 men and 125 women) cyclists will qualify to compete. 180 will qualify in road/track, 40 in mountain biking and 30 in BMX. Various events and rankings were used to determine the qualifiers. A nation could enter a maximum of 28 athletes, four in mountain biking (two per gender), four in BMX (three per gender) and a combined 20 for road and track (ten men and ten women). El Salvador as host nation, was automatically awarded the maximum quota of 28 spots.

Qualification timeline

Qualification summary 
A total of 26 countries qualified cyclists after reallocation. The qualification charts below do not represent qualified countries after reallocation. Two additional quotas were assigned for unknown reasons.

BMX

Racing 
A maximum of 15 male and 15 female athletes will be allowed to compete in BMX racing. The host nation (El Salvador) automatically receives the maximum of two quota spots per event, and all other nations may qualify a maximum of two athletes per event. All qualification will be done using the UCI rankings as of December 31, 2022.

Men 

 Only 5 nations were ranked, and the last spot needs to be reallocated.

Women 

 Only 4 nations were ranked, and the last spot needs to be reallocated.

Mountain biking 
A maximum of 20 male and 20 female athletes will be allowed to compete in mountain biking. The host nation (El Salvador) automatically receives the maximum two quota spot per event, and all other nations may qualify a maximum of two athletes per event. Qualification was done across three tournaments.

Men

Women

Track cycling

Men's team sprint

Men's sprint 

* Qualified as a continental representative

Men's Keirin

Men's team pursuit

Men's Madison

Men's Omnium 

* Qualified as a continental representative

Women's team sprint

Women's sprint 

* Qualified as a continental representative

Women's Keirin

Women's team pursuit

Women's Madison

Women's Omnium

Road events

Men's road race 

* Quota reduced by one to accommodate for the individual qualifiers

Men's individual time trial 

** Qualified as a continental representative

Women's road race 

* Quota reduced by one to accommodate for the individual qualifiers

Women's individual time trial

References 

Qualification for the 2023 Central American and Caribbean Games